Actinopus is a genus of mygalomorph spiders in the family Actinopodidae. It was first described by Josef Anton Maximilian Perty in 1833 from the type species Actinopus tarsalis found in Brazil. The name is derived from Greek actin- "ray, beam" and pous "foot". It is a senior synonym of Aussereria, Closterochilus, Pachyloscelis, and Theragretes.

The few reported bites from Brazil resulted in no symptoms, indicating that they can deliver dry bites or small amounts of venom. However, they should be treated with caution due to some reports of bites causing local pain and muscle contractions. These spider also have a low venom yield, Actinopus crassipes for example has a mean venom yield of 0.09 mg.

Species
 it contains 97 species:
A. anselmoi Miglio, Pérez-Miles & Bonaldo, 2020 – Brazil
A. apalai Miglio, Pérez-Miles & Bonaldo, 2020 – Brazil
A. apiacas Miglio, Pérez-Miles & Bonaldo, 2020 – Brazil
A. argenteus Ríos-Tamayo & Goloboff, 2018 – Argentina
A. ariasi Ríos-Tamayo & Goloboff, 2018 – Argentina
A. azaghal Miglio, Pérez-Miles & Bonaldo, 2020 – Brazil
A. balcarce Ríos-Tamayo & Goloboff, 2018 – Argentina
A. bocaina Miglio, Pérez-Miles & Bonaldo, 2020 – Brazil
A. buritiensis Miglio, Pérez-Miles & Bonaldo, 2020 – Brazil
A. candango Miglio, Pérez-Miles & Bonaldo, 2020 – Brazil
A. caraiba (Simon, 1889) – Venezuela
A. castelo Miglio, Pérez-Miles & Bonaldo, 2020 – Brazil
A. casuhati Ríos-Tamayo & Goloboff, 2018 – Argentina
A. caxiuana Miglio, Pérez-Miles & Bonaldo, 2020 – Brazil
A. clavero Ríos-Tamayo & Goloboff, 2018 – Argentina
A. coboi Ríos-Tamayo, 2019 – Uruguay
A. cochabamba Ríos-Tamayo, 2016 – Bolivia
A. concinnus Miglio, Pérez-Miles & Bonaldo, 2020 – Venezuela
A. confusus Miglio, Pérez-Miles & Bonaldo, 2020 – Brazil
A. cordobensis Ríos-Tamayo & Goloboff, 2018 – Argentina
A. cornelli Miglio, Pérez-Miles & Bonaldo, 2020 – Brazil
A. coylei Ríos-Tamayo & Goloboff, 2018 – Argentina
A. crassipes (Keyserling, 1891) – Brazil, Paraguay, Argentina
A. cucutaensis Mello-Leitão, 1941 – Colombia, Venezuela, Brazil
A. dioi Miglio, Pérez-Miles & Bonaldo, 2020 – Brazil
A. dubiomaculatus Mello-Leitão, 1923 – Brazil
A. ducke Miglio, Pérez-Miles & Bonaldo, 2020 – Brazil
A. echinus Mello-Leitão, 1949 – Brazil
A. emas Miglio, Pérez-Miles & Bonaldo, 2020 – Brazil
A. excavatus Ríos-Tamayo & Goloboff, 2018 – Argentina
A. fernandezi Ríos-Tamayo, 2019 – Uruguay
A. fractus Mello-Leitão, 1920 – Brazil
A. gerschiapelliarum Ríos-Tamayo & Goloboff, 2018 – Uruguay, Argentina
A. goloboffi Ríos-Tamayo, 2014 – Argentina
A. guajara Miglio, Pérez-Miles & Bonaldo, 2020 – Brazil
A. harti Pocock, 1895 – Trinidad
A. harveyi Miglio, Pérez-Miles & Bonaldo, 2020 – Brazil
A. hirsutus Miglio, Pérez-Miles & Bonaldo, 2020 – Brazil
A. indiamuerta Ríos-Tamayo & Goloboff, 2018 – Argentina
A. insignis (Holmberg, 1881) – Uruguay, Argentina
A. ipioca Miglio, Pérez-Miles & Bonaldo, 2020 – Brazil
A. itacolomi Miglio, Pérez-Miles & Bonaldo, 2020 – Brazil
A. itapitocai Miglio, Pérez-Miles & Bonaldo, 2020 – Brazil
A. itaqui Miglio, Pérez-Miles & Bonaldo, 2020 – Brazil
A. jaboticatubas Miglio, Pérez-Miles & Bonaldo, 2020 – Brazil
A. jamari Miglio, Pérez-Miles & Bonaldo, 2020 – Brazil
A. laventana Miglio, Pérez-Miles & Bonaldo, 2020 – Uruguay, Argentina
A. liodon (Ausserer, 1875) – Uruguay
A. lomalinda Miglio, Pérez-Miles & Bonaldo, 2020 – Colombia, Guyana
A. longipalpis C. L. Koch, 1842 – Uruguay, Argentina
A. magnus Ríos-Tamayo & Goloboff, 2018 – Argentina
A. mairinquensis Miglio, Pérez-Miles & Bonaldo, 2020 – Brazil
A. mesa Miglio, Pérez-Miles & Bonaldo, 2020 – Brazil
A. nattereri (Doleschall, 1871) – Brazil
A. nigripes (Lucas, 1834) – Brazil
A. obidos Miglio, Pérez-Miles & Bonaldo, 2020 – Brazil
A. osbournei Miglio, Pérez-Miles & Bonaldo, 2020 – Brazil
A. palmar Ríos-Tamayo & Goloboff, 2018 – Argentina
A. pampa Ríos-Tamayo & Goloboff, 2018 – Argentina
A. pampulha Miglio, Pérez-Miles & Bonaldo, 2020 – Brazil
A. panguana Miglio, Pérez-Miles & Bonaldo, 2020 – Peru
A. parafundulus Miglio, Pérez-Miles & Bonaldo, 2020 – Brazil
A. paraitinga Miglio, Pérez-Miles & Bonaldo, 2020 – Brazil
A. paranensis Mello-Leitão, 1920 – Brazil
A. patagonia Ríos-Tamayo & Goloboff, 2018 – Argentina
A. pertyi Lucas, 1843 – South America
A. piceus (Ausserer, 1871) – Brazil
A. pindapoy Miglio, Pérez-Miles & Bonaldo, 2020 – Argentina
A. pinhao Miglio, Pérez-Miles & Bonaldo, 2020 – Brazil
A. princeps Chamberlin, 1917 – Brazil
A. puelche Ríos-Tamayo & Goloboff, 2018 – Uruguay, Argentina
A. pusillus Mello-Leitão, 1920 – Brazil
A. ramirezi Ríos-Tamayo & Goloboff, 2018 – Argentina
A. reycali Ríos-Tamayo & Goloboff, 2018 – Argentina
A. reznori Miglio, Pérez-Miles & Bonaldo, 2020 – Brazil
A. robustus (O. Pickard-Cambridge, 1892) – Panama
A. rojasi (Simon, 1889) – Venezuela
A. rufibarbis Mello-Leitão, 1930 – Brazil
A. rufipes (Lucas, 1834) – Brazil
A. scalops (Simon, 1889) – Venezuela
A. septemtrionalis Ríos-Tamayo & Goloboff, 2018 – Argentina
A. simoi Ríos-Tamayo, 2019 – Uruguay
A. szumikae Ríos-Tamayo & Goloboff, 2018 – Argentina
A. taragui Ríos-Tamayo & Goloboff, 2018 – Argentina
A. tarsalis Perty, 1833 – Brazil
A. tasneemae (Sherwood & Pett, 2022) – Paraguay
A. tetymapyta (Sherwood & Pett, 2022) – Paraguay
A. trinotatus Mello-Leitão, 1938 – Brazil
A. tutu Miglio, Pérez-Miles & Bonaldo, 2020 – Brazil
A. urucui Miglio, Pérez-Miles & Bonaldo, 2020 – Brazil
A. uruguayense Ríos-Tamayo, 2019 – Uruguay
A. utinga Miglio, Pérez-Miles & Bonaldo, 2020 – Brazil
A. valencianus (Simon, 1889) – Venezuela
A. vilhena Miglio, Pérez-Miles & Bonaldo, 2020 – Brazil
A. wallacei F. O. Pickard-Cambridge, 1896 – Brazil
A. xenus Chamberlin, 1917 – South America
A. xingu Miglio, Pérez-Miles & Bonaldo, 2020 – Brazil

Formerly included:
A. bonneti (Zapfe, 1961) (Transferred to Plesiolena)
A. gracilis (Hentz, 1842) (Transferred to Antrodiaetus)

See also
 List of Actinopodidae species

References

Further reading

Actinopodidae
Actinopus
Mygalomorphae genera
Taxa named by Maximilian Perty
Spiders of South America
Spiders of Central America